James Michael Flynn (born 5 October 1993 in Sale, England) is a rugby union player for the Saracens in the Premiership Rugby. He plays as a prop. He made his professional debut for Sale Sharks against London Irish on 11 November 2012.

References

1993 births
Living people
Ampthill RUFC players
English rugby union players
Jersey Reds players
Leeds Tykes players
Rugby union players from Sale, Greater Manchester
Rugby union props
Sale Sharks players